NASA Design Reference Mission 3.0 was a NASA study for a human space mission to the planet Mars in the 1990s. It was a plan for a human exploration architecture for Mars, and was released in 1998 as an addendum to the early design plans released in 1994. The plan is for a series of multiple launches to send various space transpiration, surface exploration hardware, and human crew to Mars, and to return the crew to Earth in the early 21st century. Various technologies are explored to launch the payloads into space, to send them to Mars, and to reduce overall weight of the mission by various technologies or techniques including nuclear, solar, aerobraking, and in-situ resource use.

Overview
The study was performed by the NASA Mars Exploration Team at the NASA's Johnson Space Center (JSC) in the 1990s. Personnel representing several NASA field centers formulated a "Reference Mission" addressing human exploration of Mars. The plan describes the first human missions to Mars with concept of operations and technologies to be used as a first cut at an architecture. The architecture for the Mars Reference Mission builds on previous work, principally on the work of the Synthesis Group (1991) and Robert Zubrin's (1991) concepts for the use of propellants derived from the Martian atmosphere. The primary purpose of the Reference Mission was to stimulate further thought and development of alternative approaches which can improve effectiveness, reduce risks, and reduce cost. Improvements can be made at several levels; for example, in the architectural, mission, and system levels.

The report of the Reference Mission Version 3.0 states:

From the work of the original Reference Mission (Version 1.0), the strategy for the human exploration of Mars has evolved from its original form to one of reduced system mass, use of a smaller, more reasonable launch vehicle, and use of more current technology. The steps which have been taken by the Exploration Team are motivated by the need to reduce the mass of the payload delivery flights, as well as the overall mission cost, without introducing additional mission risk. By eliminating the need for a large heavy-lift launch vehicle and deleting the redundant habitat delivery flight in Version 3.0, two launches from the Earth were eliminated. The net result is a current Version 3.0 Reference Mission which requires an injected mass of approximately one-half that of the 1993/94 Reference Mission.

The purpose of the Reference plan, including the 3.0 update is to provide a template for a variety of Mars mission planning and technology purposes, and also to stimulate thought and further ideas for Mars missions in the "exploration community and beyond".

Aspects
List:

Cargo Vehicles 
Piloted Vehicles
Mars Surface Lander
Inflatable Surface Habitat
Magnum Launch Vehicle
Propulsion studies including
Nuclear Thermal Rocket
Solar Electric
Earth Return Vehicle
Aerobrake at Mars 
In-situ resource 
Misc. Other items

Mission items
The DRM 3.0 covered or touched upon a wide variety of institutions, vehicle, and mission concepts which are further explored or analyzed.

Examples:
Evolved Expendable Launch Vehicle (EELV)
Earth Entry Vehicle
EVA Mobility Unit
Electric Propulsion Module
Earth Return Vehicle
Extra Vehicular Activity
Mars Habitat
Heavy Lift Launch Vehicle
Initial Mass in Low Earth Orbit
In-Situ Resource Utilization
Liquid Fly Back Booster
Life Support System
Mars Ascent Vehicle
Mars Transfer Vehicle
Nuclear Thermal Propulsion
Nuclear Thermal Rocket
Pressurized Control Research Vehicle
Power Management and Distribution
Photovoltaic Array
Reaction Control System
Shuttle Derived Vehicle
Solar Electric Propulsion
Space Transportation System
Transit Habitat
Thermal Protection System

Institutions
Ames Research Center
Marshall Space Flight Center
Jet Propulsion Laboratory
Johnson Space Center
Kennedy Space Center
Langley Research Center
Lewis Research Center (later renamed Glenn Research Center)

Mission plan
Info graphic highlight a possible sequence of launches to Mars and overall design. On the left is a sequence of launches that would send mission items to Mars and the right, it shows how they are utilized. A major component that was sent is the Earth return vehicle, which would use aerobraking to get into Mars orbit. Next, a cargo Mars lander would get important hardware to the surface of Mars which would also use aerobraking. Finally, the crew would land on the surface and use the pre-positioned hardware to conduct the mission and then return to Earth. This plan would use the in-situ production of fuel for Mars ascent stage of returning crew. Both aerocapture and in-situ resource production were methods to reduce overall launch weight of mission plan.

See also
Exploration of Mars
Mars Direct
Marsbook
List of crewed Mars mission plans

References

External links

NASA Design Reference Mission
JSC Exploration Site
Addendum (Update) to Human Exploration of Mars: The Reference Mission of the NASA Mars Exploration Study Team, 1998, NASA JSC Exploration Office (Mars Reference Mission - DRM 3.0)
A Mission Design for International Manned Mars Mission, From the 1991 International Space University (ISU) Design Project (Mendell, Wendell)
Mars Exploration Strategies: A Reference Program and Comparison of Alternative Architectures
Design Reference Mission 3.0 (Astronautix)
Human Exploration of Mars: The Reference Mission of the NASA Mars Exploration Study Team
NASA TP 2001-209371: The Mars Surface Reference Mission: A Description of Human and Robotic Surface Activities
Stoffel, Wilhelm, and Wendell Mendell, "An Organizational Model for an International Mars Mission", From the 1991 International Space University (ISU) Design Project
Weaver, David B., and Michael B. Duke, "Mars Exploration Strategies: A Reference Program and Comparison of Alternative Architectures, Conference Paper AIAA 93-4212, (1993)
Weaver, David B., Michael B. Duke, and Barney B. Roberts, "Mars Exploration Strategies: A Reference Design Mission," Conference Paper IAF 93-Q.1.383, (1993)

General Mars exploration
The Mars Society Paper Archive
PDF summary of Mars Society Papers
Spacecraft Design Reference Library

NASA oversight
Human missions to Mars